Vriesea parviflora is a plant species in the genus Vriesea. This species is endemic to Brazil.

References

parviflora
Flora of Brazil